Le dossier Toroto is a 2011 French film directed by Jean-Pierre Mocky.

Cast 
 Jean Abeillé (Professeur Toroto)
 Jean-Pierre Mocky (Le professeur Lapine)
 Romain Gontier (Riri)
 Olivier Hémon (Le Brigadier)
 Guillaume Delaunay (Vitupin 1)
 Lionel Laget (Vitupin 2)
 Emmanuel Nakach (Joseph)
 Pamela Ravassard (Marie)
 Jean Luc Atlan (Docteur Klaus)
 Anksa Kara (Irma, l'intendante)
 Raphaël Scheer (Le Nonce du Pape)
 Christian Chauvaud (Marco Le chef des grosses bites)
 Idriss (Marco 2)
 Pascal Lagrandeur (Membre des grosses bites)
 Julie Baronnie (Mme Baron)
 Serge Bos (Le prêtre)
 Fabien Jegoudez (Le professeur Suédois)
 Noël Simsolo (Mr Noir / Blanc)
 Marie Noelle Pigeau (Mme Noir / Blanc)
 Mauricette Gourdon (Ida)
 Jean Christophe Herbert (Père Blanc)
 Jana Bittnerova (Femme du Brigadier)
 Cyrille Dobbels (Politique 1)
 Alain Schlosberg (Politique 2)
 Christophe Bier (Politique 3)
 Patrick Lebadezai (Politique 4)
 Michel Stobac (Colonel Pascal au cul poilu)
 Eric Cornet (Lieutenant)
 Alexis Wawerka (Moine)
 Jean Philippe Bonnet (Moine 2)
 Fabrice Colson (Robert)
 Laure Hennequart (Infirmière)
 Françoise Armelle (Chienne de Garde)
 Clément Bobo (Riri 10 ans)
 Charlotte Ciprey (Cousine Riri)
 Joelle Hélary (Dame Marriage 1)
 Valérie Lejeune (Dame Marriage 2)

See also 
 Cinema of France
 List of French language films

External links
 

2011 films
French comedy films
2010s French-language films
Films scored by Vladimir Cosma
Films directed by Jean-Pierre Mocky
2010s French films